Agbadi is a village in Benue State, eastern Nigeria.

Geography 
The village lies 15 km northeast of Makurdi, the state capital, and is 6 km from the northern shore of the Benue River.

References

External links 
 Agbadi on Geonames

Populated places in Benue State